= First Republic of China =

The First Republic of China may refer to:

- Beiyang government (1912–1928), as opposed to the Nationalist government (1925–1948) after the Northern Expedition, sometimes referred to as the "Second Republic of China".
- The Republic of China, including Taiwan before 1991, under the era of the Kuomintang's one-party dictatorship.
